The 1965–66 Sheffield Shield season was the 64th season of the Sheffield Shield, the domestic first-class cricket competition of Australia. New South Wales won the championship.

Table

Statistics

Most Runs
Grahame Thomas 837

Most Wickets
Tony Lock 41

References

Sheffield Shield
Sheffield Shield
Sheffield Shield seasons